Ryan Williams may refer to:

Sports
Ryan Williams (American football) (born 1990), American football player
Ryan Williams (Australian rules footballer) (born 1988), Australian former Australian rules footballer
Ryan Williams (BMX rider) (born 1994), Australian freestyle BMX and scooter rider
Ryan Williams (footballer, born 1978), English footballer
Ryan Williams (footballer, born 1991), English footballer
Ryan Williams (men's soccer, born 1996), American soccer midfielder
Ryan Williams (soccer, born 1993), Australian soccer winger, playing for Perth Glory
Ryan Williams (women's soccer) (born 1996), American soccer defender

Other
Ryan Williams (computer scientist) (born 1979), American computer scientist
Ryan Williams (entrepreneur) (born 1988), technology entrepreneur
Ryan Williams (American politician) (born 1973), member of the Tennessee House of Representatives
Ryan Williams (Canadian politician)
Ryan Piers Williams (born 1984), American actor, director, and writer
Ryun Williams